James Earle Fraser may refer to:
 James Earle Fraser (sculptor) (1876–1953), American sculptor
 James E. Fraser (historian), Canadian historian

See also
James Fraser (disambiguation)